This is a List of Japanese musical groups that debuted in the 2010s.

See also the list of groups that debuted in the 1990s, 2000s and 2020s.

2010

ClariS
Danceroid
Dorothy Little Happy
Ebisu Muscats
Frederic
French Kiss
Gacharic Spin
Keytalk
Kishida Kyoudan & The Akeboshi Rockets
Man with a Mission
Negoto
NYC
Passpo
Rootless
Sakura Gakuin
Sandaime J Soul Brothers
SDN48
Sekai no Owari
Shinsei Kamattechan
Super Girls
Tokyo Girls' Style
Tokyo Shoegazer
White Ash
World Order
YuiKaori

2011

Altima
Bis
Czecho No Republic
Diaura
Diva
Dream Morning Musume
E-girls
Earthbound Papas
Egoist
Fairies
Flower
Happiness
Houkago Princess
Kamen Rider Girls
Kis-My-Ft2
Lama
LinQ
Mejibray
N Zero
NMB48
Not Yet
Passepied
Predia
Queen Bee
Sea*A
Sexy Zone
Shiritsu Ebisu Chugaku

2012

A.B.C-Z
Abcho
Ace of Spades
Air Swell
Alma Kaminiito
Anna S
Babymetal
Babyraids Japan
Band Ja Naimon!
Bakusute Sotokanda Icchome
Bridear
Clear's
Cyntia
Dancing Dolls
Doll$Boxx
Exile The Second
Exile Tribe
Eyelis
For Tracy Hyde
Generations from Exile Tribe
Haruka to Miyuki
Hello Sleepwalkers
Iris
Kyuso Nekokami
Lovely Doll
Lyrical School
My First Story
Nocturnal Bloodlust
Nogizaka46
Party Rockets GT
Prizmmy
Puretty
Rabbit
Ryutist
Silent Siren
StylipS
Sweet ARMS
Sweety
Team Shachi
Tone Jewel
Tricot
Ultra Girl (band)
Up Up Girls Kakko Kari

2013

All City Steppers
AŌP
Ayumikurikamaki
BRADIO
Busaiku
Charisma.com
Cheeky Parade
Cö Shu Nie
Cream
Da-ice
Dance Earth Party
Desurabbits
Dish
Doll Elements
Especia
Fhána
Gesu no Kiwami Otome
HKT48
HR
Juice=Juice
Jupiter
Kana-Boon
Lovendor
M Three
Mimi Meme Mimi
Natsuiro
Otome Shinto
Scenarioart
Screen Mode
Shishamo
Sunmyu
Tempura Kidz
The Oral Cigarettes
Tsuri Bit
WHY@DOLL
You'll Melt More!
Yumemiru Adolescence

2014

Ame no Parade
Band-Maid
Chelsy
Color-code
Country Girls
Doberman Infinity
Flap Girls' School
Flower Flower
Folks
Garnidelia
GEM
Hanafugetsu
Happy
Johnny's West
Little Glee Monster
Maison Book Girl
Masochistic Ono Band
Mili
Necronomidol
Niji no Conquistador
Passcode
Pla2me
Real
Rev. from DVL
Sukekiyo
Sumika
The fin.
Tokyo Performance Doll
Wagakki Band
Wanima
X21
Ykiki Beat

2015

3776
Akishibu Project
Billie Idle
Bish
Earphones
Ebisu Muscats
Idol Renaissance
Iginari Tohoku San
Kolme
La PomPon
Ladybaby
lol
POP
Magnolia Factory
Mrs. Green Apple
Myth & Roid
Official Hige Dandism
OxT.
Pasocom Music Club
Pentagon
Srv.Vinci
Sora tob sakana
Suchmos
Tacoyaki Rainbow
Tokimeki Sendenbu
The Hoopers
The Peggies
TrySail
Wednesday Campanella
Whiteeeen

2016

3B junior
Batten Girls
Bis
Chai
chelmico
DYGL
FEMM
FlowBack
Gang Parade
Hiragana Keyakizaka46
Keyakizaka46
Musubizm
OnePixcel
Poppin'Party
Pyxis
Reol
Rock A Japonica
ShuuKaRen
Tempalay
The Sixth Lie
The World Standard
Yahyel
Zenbu Kimi no Sei da.

2017

=Love
22/7
Atarashii Gakko!
Brats
Camellia Factory
Cellchrome
Chō Tokimeki Sendenbu
CY8ER
Cynhn
Dimlim
Faky
Leetspeak Monsters
Lovebites
Mellow Mellow
Migma Shelter
NGT48
Novelbright
Pink Babies
Pink Cres.
Polkadot Stingray
Qyoto
Roselia
SudannaYuzuYully
The Rampage from Exile Tribe
Yorushika

2018

Crown Pop
dps
Empire
Fantastics from Exile Tribe
First Place
Hachimitsu Rocket
King & Prince
Raise A Suilen
Spira Spica
STU48
Uijin
Yoshimotozaka46
Zutomayo

2019

≠Me
ALI
Argonavis from BanG Dream!
B.O.L.T
Ballistik Boyz from Exile Tribe
Beyooooonds
Bis
Carry Loose
College Cosmos
Dialogue
Dos Monos
DracoVirgo
Girls²
Hinatazaka46
Honest Boyz
King Gnu
Mameshiba no Taigun
Sard Underground
Tebasaki Sensation
Yoasobi
ZOC

See also
 List of Japanese musical groups (2020s)

 
2010s in Japanese music